Cosmioconcha dedonderi is a species of sea snail, a marine gastropod mollusk in the family Columbellidae, the dove snails.

Description
The length of the shell attains 9 mm.

Distribution
This species occurs in the Caribbean Sea off Panama.

References

 Monsecour, K. & Monsecour, D., 2006. Two new Cosmioconcha (Gastropoda: Neogastropoda: Columbellidae) from the Caribbean. Gloria Maris 45(1-2): 7-13

External links

Columbellidae
Gastropods described in 2006